Euphorbia jamesonii is a species of plant in the family Euphorbiaceae. It is endemic to Ecuador.  Its natural habitats are subtropical or tropical moist montane forests and subtropical or tropical dry shrubland.

References

Endemic flora of Ecuador
jamesonii
Vulnerable plants
Taxonomy articles created by Polbot
Taxa named by Pierre Edmond Boissier